Shin Hyun-soo (born July 8, 1989) is a South Korean actor. He began his career in acting through musicals before starring in television series.

Filmography

Film

Television series

Web series

Theater

Awards and nominations

References

External links
 

1989 births
Living people
People from Incheon
South Korean male television actors
21st-century South Korean male actors